Manon Dubé was a 10 year old Canadian girl from Sherbrooke, Quebec who disappeared on January 27, 1978, and was found dead in Ayer's Cliff on March 24, 1978.

Although the precise cause of Dubé's death remains uncertain, Canada's National Post has unveiled compelling evidence that she was murdered. After discovering links between the circumstances of Dubé's case and the close resemblance to the recent deaths of two other girls, Theresa Allore and Louise Camirand, they theorized that the 3 deaths had been committed by the same person. 

After bringing in geographic profiler, Kim Rossmo, an expert in connecting serial crimes, he strongly suggested that a serial killer was operating in the area in the 70's.

Disappearance and discovery of body
Dubé was playing with her friends and younger sister, Chantel, on January 27, 1978. Dubé, her sister, and friends had later gone sledding, but then had decided to split up when it started to get dark around 7:30 p.m. which is when Dubé was last seen.

A large search party was later conducted to find Dubé upon the request of Dubé's mother. During the time that she missing, Dube's mother Jeannine had received multiple phone calls from people saying that they had Dubé in their possession and that they wanted a $25,000 reward for her safe return, but these were just hoaxes.

Dubé's body was found partially frozen face down in a stream on March 24, 1978 on Good Friday by two young boys who were from Montreal. Dubé had the same winter clothes on when she was last seen and had a gash on her forehead which may have been caused by a strike, which has led some people to believe that foul play was involved. Dubé also had suffered broken bones and is also believed to have been the victim of a hit and run by the RCMP, and is believed by some people that she may also have been sexually abused.

Aftermath
Dubé's body was taken to Montreal where an autopsy was performed. It was suggested that the gash on her head may have been caused by something metal and that she may have been transported to the stream where was disposed of and that she may have been there for less than two months and less than the time that she was missing for. The case is still open.

See also
List of kidnappings
List of solved missing person cases
List of unsolved deaths
List of unsolved murders

References

External links
Amateur sleuthing reveals a likely murder that remains unsolved
Hanes, Allison (June 16, 2006). "Pattern points to serial rapist". National Post. Toronto. Retrieved 12 January 2010.
Kim Rossmo, ed. (2009). Criminal Investigative Failures. Boca Raton, Florida: CRC Press. ISBN 978-1-4200-4751-6. OCLC 226966553.
Manon Dubé found dead in stream
Quebec 1977: Who Was The Bootlace Killer?
The aborted abduction of Manon Dubé - #9 WKT6
Wojna, Lisa (2009). Unsolved Murders of Canada. Edmonton: Quagmire Press. ISBN 978-0-9783409-5-7.

1970s missing person cases
1978 in Quebec
1978 murders in Canada
Articles containing video clips
Canadian murder victims
Deaths by person in Canada
Female murder victims
Formerly missing people
History of Quebec
Incidents of violence against girls
Kidnapped Canadian children
Missing person cases in Canada
Murdered Canadian children
Unsolved deaths
Unsolved murders in Canada
Violence against women in Canada
Year of birth missing